The 2005–06 Golden State Warriors season was the team's 60th in the NBA, and their 44th in Oakland. They began the season hoping to improve upon their 34-48 output from the previous season. They tied it exactly, finishing 34-48 again, but failed to qualify for the playoffs for the twelfth straight season.

Draft

Roster

Regular season

Season standings

Record vs. opponents

Transactions

Subtractions

References

Golden State Warriors seasons
Golden State Warriors
Golden State Warriors
Golden State Warriors